Rutowski Park is a municipal park and preserve in Bayonne, New Jersey. It is located at the northeastern end of the city near the mouth of the Hackensack River at Newark Bay south of New Jersey Route 440. It is a component of the Hackensack RiverWalk and is connected by footpath to Stephen R. Gregg Park—Hudson County Park. The park encompasses . and includes a boardwalk through the wetlands preservation area and remnants of the Electric Launch Company. Opened in 2006, it is named for former Mayor of Bayonne (1990–1994), Richard Rutowski.

References 

2006 establishments in New Jersey
Parks established in 2006
Parks in Hudson County, New Jersey
Bayonne, New Jersey
Wetlands of New Jersey